Paul Kellam (born 1965) is a Professor of Viral Genomics at Imperial College London and vice-president of infectious diseases and vaccines at Kymab Ltd. He is co-author of the Oxford textbook Human Virology.

Education
Kellam attended Oakwood Park Grammar School. He received a Bachelor Science in Microbiology from the University of Reading in 1987 and a PhD in Virology from the University of London in 1994.

Advisory panels
As of 2021, Professor Kellam sits on the PHE Serology Working Group as a member of the Scientific Advisory Group for Emergencies in response to COVID-19.

Kellam is chair of the Microbiology Society Policy Committee.

Awards and honours
Fellow of the American Academy of Microbiology, American Society for Microbiology, July 2015.

Selected works

References

External links

1965 births
Living people
British virologists
Alumni of the University of Reading
Alumni of the University of London